Sir William Wightman (28 September 1784 – 10 December 1863) was a British judge.

Life
Wightman came of an old Dumfriesshire family, the son of William Wightman, gentleman, of St. Clement's, London, and his wife, Elisabeth. He was baptised at St Clement Danes at nearly 1 year old. He was an undergraduate of University College, Oxford, where he matriculated on 23 March 1801, and on 21 June was elected to a Michel exhibition at Queen's College, graduating BA on 30 May 1805, and MA on 23 October 1809; from 1859 to 1863 he was an honorary fellow of his college.

On 31 January 1804, Wightman entered Lincoln's Inn, and, after some years of practice as a special pleader, he was called to the bar in 1821. In 1830 he transferred himself to the Inner Temple and joined the Northern Circuit. He was known as a sound and clear-headed lawyer, and for several years held the post of junior counsel to the treasury. He was appointed a member of the commission of 1830 upon the practice of the common law courts, and of that of 1833 upon the proposal for a criminal law digest. He was engaged in many celebrated cases, particularly the prosecutions arising out of the Bristol riots; but, owing to an almost excessive modesty, was little known except to his profession. In February 1841 he was promoted to a judgeship of the Queen's Bench, on the resignation of Mr Justice Joseph Littledale, and was knighted on 28 April, and here he served as a judge for nearly 23 years. While on circuit at York, on 9 December 1863, he was seized with an attack of apoplexy, and died next day.

Family
Wightman married in 1819, Charlotte Mary Baird, daughter of James Baird of Lasswade, near Edinburgh. They had four daughters:

 Caroline Elizabeth, who married the Rev. Peter Almeric Leheup Wood.
 Mary Henrietta, who married Henry Roxby Benson.
 Frances Lucy, who married Matthew Arnold the poet.
 Georgina, unmarried.

Arms

References 

 Attribution

1784 births
1863 deaths
English barristers
Knights Bachelor
Members of Lincoln's Inn
Members of the Inner Temple
Alumni of University College, Oxford
Alumni of The Queen's College, Oxford
Justices of the King's Bench
19th-century English judges